Spread in Madrid, Toledo and areas of influence, between the 16th and 18th centuries, it is found built of wooden armor and generally covered with slate stone or metal. It is stylistically related to the spiers of Central Europe (Austria, Flanders, the Netherlands, and others).

It generally consists of a quadrangular tower at its base, on top of it a conical or pyramidal wooden frame with a slate or metal cover with dormers directed towards the four cardinal points. In the angle of the main pyramid or skirt the lantern or temple is located and on it an elongated quadrangular pyramid, sometimes octagonal, on which a metallic sphere or ball, the weather vane and finally the metal cross are placed, as frequent decorations.

The proportional height of the Madrid spire with respect to the total dimension of the tower, is generally one third of its total height or sometimes greater, with which an effect of notable verticality and elevation perception is achieved, even more so when viewed from the distance.

References 

16th-century architecture
17th-century architecture
18th-century architecture